Calliostoma ticaonicum is a species of sea snail, a marine gastropod mollusk in the family Calliostomatidae.

Description
The sharply conical shell is elevated but still rather small : 5 – 20 mm. It is perforate. Its color goes from a yellowish-brown to a pale pink. It is ornamented at
the suture with lirae articulated with rufous. The apex is blackish-purple. The whorls are slightly angled, a little rounded, and longitudinally striate. They are sculptured with fine spiral cords. The body whorl is subangular. The base of the shell is almost flat with the umbilicus absent. The base is sculptured with rufous-articulated cinguli. The aperture is subquadrate. The columella is straight, and subtruncated anteriorly. The aperture is white inside.

Distribution
This species can be found in the seas off the Philippines and Japan.

References

 Poppe, G.T., S.P. Tagaro and H. Dekker 2006  The Seguenziidae, Chilodontidae, Trochidae, Calliostomatiidae & Solariellidae of the Philippine Islands with the description of 1 new genus, 2 new subgenus, 70 new species and 1 new subspecies.

External links
 

ticaonicum
Gastropods described in 1851